Budgie is an independent, free and open-source desktop environment for Linux and other Unix-like operating systems that targets the desktop metaphor. Budgie is developed by the Buddies of Budgie organization, which is composed of a team of contributors from Linux distributions such as Fedora, Debian, and Arch Linux. Its design emphasizes simplicity, minimalism, and elegance, while providing the means to extend or customize the desktop in various ways. Unlike desktop environments like Cinnamon, Budgie does not have a reference platform, and all distributions that ship Budgie are recommended to set defaults that best fit their desired user experience.

History 
Budgie was created by Ikey Doherty as the default desktop environment for his new Linux distribution, EvolveOS, which was eventually renamed to Solus. The intention was to use GNOME components to create a more lightweight and traditional desktop that still had most of the features that GNOME provided at the time.

Budgie would see a flurry of releases in 2015, culminating in version 10 being released in December of that year, a full rewrite of the codebase in the Vala programming language. The desktop would soon spread to distributions other than Solus, with SparkyLinux and Manjaro adopting the desktop environment in 2015. Ubuntu and Arch Linux would follow in 2016, with a dedicated "remix" edition for Ubuntu being created, eventually renamed to Ubuntu Budgie when it was adopted by Canonical as an official flavor.

Joshua Strobl, one of the members of the newly formed Solus core team and an already active contributor to Budgie, would take up the responsibility of continuing Budgie's development after Doherty's departure.

On , Strobl announced that the long-awaited Budgie 11 release would no longer be using GTK due to disagreements with the direction that the toolkit had been taking. It was also announced that the GNOME software suite that had been shipped in the Budgie edition of Solus would be replaced in future versions.

On , Strobl resigned from Solus and established Buddies of Budgie, a new organization for Budgie development, with other active contributors. Under this new organization, Budgie development shifted from being focused on Solus to being focused on improving the experience across all distributions that ship Budgie.

Additional components

Budgie Desktop View 
Budgie Desktop View is a software component meant to provide desktop icons within Budgie. Budgie Desktop View is implemented in Vala, and uses GTK 3 for widgets. The source code is available under the Apache License 2.0.

Budgie Control Center 
Budgie Control Center is a fork of GNOME Control Center with Budgie-specific settings and features, and is the standard settings application for Budgie. Budgie Control Center is implemented in C, and uses GTK 3 and libhandy for widgets. The source code is available under the GNU GPLv2.

Budgie Screensaver 
Budgie Screensaver is a fork of GNOME Screensaver with additional fixes and minor updates, and serves to provide an authentication prompt when the system is locked. Budgie Screensaver is implemented in C, and uses GTK 3 for widgets. The source code is available under the GNU GPLv2.

Budgie Backgrounds 
Budgie Backgrounds is Budgie's default set of background images for use with Linux distributions that do not provide their own, and is entirely composed of public domain images. The source code and images are available under the Creative Commons Zero v1.0 license.

Releases

Adoption

Reception 
Budgie has been generally well received, with reviews noting its appealing visual design and intuitive layout. Bertel King wrote in 2018 that "Budgie feels like someone took the great things about GNOME, took out all the not so great things, set some great default options, and sent that out into the world." However, King also considered this a negative, writing that Budgie "can feel more like a customized version of GNOME than a separate entity." John Perkins described Budgie as "a beautiful desktop that aims to provide sane defaults and a beautiful interface," while lamenting its limited availability on distributions other than Solus.

Gallery

See also 
GNOME
LXQt
MATE (software)
Cinnamon (desktop environment)
Solus (operating system)

References

External links 
 
 Budgie Desktop on OpenSourceFeed Gallery

Desktop environments based on GTK
Free desktop environments
Software forks
Software that uses Meson
X Window System